Cnemidophorus leucopsammus is a species of teiid lizard endemic to Blanquilla Island in Venezuela.

References

leucopsammus
Reptiles described in 2010
Taxa named by Gabriel N. Ugueto
Taxa named by Michael B. Harvey
Reptiles of Venezuela